Tuggleville is an unincorporated community located in Bell County, Kentucky, United States. The community is on Puckett Creek just north of Black Snake. Blackmont lies approximately two miles to the northwest on the Cumberland River.

References

Unincorporated communities in Bell County, Kentucky
Unincorporated communities in Kentucky